DE.15, DE-15, DE 15, DE15 or variant, may refer to:

DE-15, a D-subminiature connector type
 VGA connector, the common application of the DE-15 connector
 DE.15, a Nickel–Strunz classification
 
 Delaware Route 15
 DE 15, one of the postcodes for Burton upon Trent
 DE15, an OECD region, see List of OECD regions by GDP (PPP) per capita
 JNR Class DE15, a Japanese diesel locomotive type

See also
DD-15 (disambiguation)